Snap general elections were held in San Marino on 9 November 2008. They were called after the collapse of the centre-left government which had won the previous 2006 elections.

In June 2008, due to disagreements within the coalition partners, the Party of Socialists and Democrats (PSD), Popular Alliance (AP) and United Left (SU), AP left the coalition and the cabinet fell down. The PSD tried to form a narrow-majority coalition with SU and Sammarineses for Freedom (SpL), but two dissenting members of PSD left their party  and formed Arengo and Freedom (AL), leaving the proposed coalition without a majority in Parliament.

Due to the new electoral law passed earlier in 2008 which introduced a number of changes (an electoral threshold of 3.5% and a majority premium for the winning coalition, on the example of the electoral system for the Italian cities), the election was contested by two major coalitions: Pact for San Marino (centre-right) and Reforms and Freedom (centre-left).

Electoral system
Voters had to be citizens of San Marino and at least 18 years old.

Coalitions and parties 
Due to the new electoral law, Sammarinese political parties are organized in two major coalitions:
Pact for San Marino (Patto per San Marino)
Reforms and Freedom (Riforme e Libertà)

Pact for San Marino

Reforms and Freedom

Results

References

General elections in San Marino
San Marino
General election
San Marino